The 2021 Six Nations Championship (known as the Guinness Six Nations for sponsorship reasons) was the 22nd Six Nations Championship, the annual rugby union competition contested by the national teams of England, France, Ireland, Italy, Scotland, and Wales, and the 127th edition of the competition (including all its previous incarnations as the Home Nations Championship and Five Nations Championship). Due to the COVID-19 pandemic, the tournament started just three months after the end of the previous tournament and all matches took place without spectators.

England began the tournament as defending champions, having won the 2020 tournament on points difference, but only managed two wins in this tournament and finished fifth, ahead of only Italy. Wales, having finished fifth in 2020, entered the final weekend with four wins out of four and the possibility of a Grand Slam, but were beaten 32–30 by France in Saint-Denis following a late try. 

France's third match, against Scotland, had to be rescheduled after an outbreak of COVID-19 in the French camp; the match was moved to the Friday night following the final round of matches, with France needing to win by at least 21 points with a try-scoring bonus point to overtake Wales at the top of the table. They led by three points going into the final minute, only for Scotland to score a try that gave them the win and Wales the title.

Participants

Squads

Table

Table ranking rules
 Four points are awarded for a win.
 Two points are awarded for a draw.
 Bonus points are awarded to any team that scores four or more tries in a match and/or loses by seven points or fewer.
 Three bonus points are awarded to a team that wins all five of their matches (a Grand Slam). This ensures that a team that wins a Grand Slam tops the table with at least 23 points, as another team could lose one match while winning two bonus points and win the other four matches while winning four bonus points for a maximum of 22 points.
 Tiebreakers
 If two or more teams are tied on table points, the team with the better points difference (points scored less points conceded) is ranked higher.
 If the above tiebreaker fails to separate tied teams, the team that scores the higher number of total tries (including penalty tries) in their matches is ranked higher.
 If two or more teams remain tied after applying the above tiebreakers then those teams will be placed at equal rank; if the tournament has concluded and more than one team is placed first then the title will be shared between them.

Fixtures
The fixtures were announced on 20 March 2019. As with 2020, no matches were scheduled on a Friday night and the final match of the tournament was scheduled for peak time.

Round 1

Notes:
 Ignacio Brex and Daniele Rimpelli (both Italy) made their international debuts.
 Cherif Traorè was originally due to start, but was replaced by Daniele Rimpelli after being injured in the warm-up.
 France retained the Giuseppe Garibaldi Trophy.

Notes:
 Beno Obano (England), and David Cherry and Cameron Redpath (both Scotland) made their international debuts.
 Scotland won the Calcutta Cup.
 Scotland won at Twickenham for the first time since 1983.
 Joy Neville became the first woman to perform television match official duties in the men's Six Nations.

Notes:
Peter O'Mahony became the first Ireland player to receive a red card in a Six Nations match.

Round 2

Notes:
Mike Adamson became the first Scottish referee to officiate a Six Nations match since Rob Dickson in 2002.

Notes:
Willis Halaholo (Wales) made his international debut.
Wales reclaimed the Doddie Weir Cup.

Notes:
This was the 100th meeting between Ireland and France.
Ireland lost successive games at the start of a Six Nations campaign for the first time.

Round 3

Notes:
 Carlo Canna (Italy) and Robbie Henshaw (Ireland) earned their 50th test caps.
 Ryan Baird and Craig Casey (both Ireland) made their international debuts.
 Andy Farrell named an all-Leinster starting backline, the first time this has happened since 1931 and only the third time in history.
 Stephen Varney had been named to start, but was injured in the warm-up and Callum Braley started in his place, with Guglielmo Palazzani coming onto the bench.

Notes:
 George North (Wales) – at the age of 28 and 320 days – became the youngest player to earn 100 caps for his country, surpassing Australia's Michael Hooper by 28 days.
 Elliot Daly (England) earned his 50th test cap.
 Owen Farrell scored his 1,000th point for England.
 Wales' 40 points scored were the most they had ever scored against England, surpassing the 34 points scored in 1967.
 Wales recorded a bonus point victory over England for the first time since the bonus-point system was introduced in 2017.
 Wales won the Triple Crown for the 22nd time.

Round 4

Notes:
 Jake Ball (Wales) earned his 50th test cap.
 George North scored a try in his sixth consecutive Six Nations game against Italy, the best run for a player against a single team in the tournament.
 Ken Owens was the first hooker to score two or more tries in a Six Nations game since Shane Byrne scored two against Wales for Ireland in 2004.

Notes:
 Anthony Watson (England) earned his 50th test cap.

Notes:
 CJ Stander (Ireland) earned his 50th test cap.
 Ireland retain the Centenary Quaich.
 With this victory, Ireland lead their series with Scotland for the first time at 67 wins to 66 Wins

Round 5

Notes:
Alex Craig (Scotland) and Riccardo Favretto (Italy) made their international debuts.
Scotland recorded their biggest win in any of the Six Nations, Five Nations or Home Nations tournaments, surpassing their previous record of 29 points, set against Italy in 2017.

Notes:
Billy Burns (Ireland) had been named on the bench, but was ruled out ahead of kick off through injury and replaced by Ross Byrne.
Max Malins (England) had been named to start at fullback, but was ruled out ahead of kick-off through injury; Elliot Daly moved to fullback from centre, Ollie Lawrence replaced him at 13 and George Martin came onto the bench.
Ireland reclaimed the Millennium Trophy.
England lost to Ireland, Scotland and Wales in the same championship for the first time since 1976.

Notes:
Wales' three tries took them to a total of 20 for the tournament, the most they have scored in a single Six Nations.

Rescheduled Round 3 match

Notes:
Matt Fagerson was originally named at number 8 for Scotland, but suffered an injury in training and was replaced by Nick Haining; Ryan Wilson replaced Haining among the substitutes.
Ryan Wilson (Scotland) earned his 50th test cap.
Scotland won in Paris for the first time since a 36–22 victory in 1999.
With this victory, Scotland beat both England and France away from home for the first time in the tournament since 1926 and only the second time in 45 attempts.
Scotland retained the Auld Alliance Trophy.

Player statistics

Most points

Most tries

See also
2021 Women's Six Nations Championship

Notes

References

 
2021
2021 rugby union tournaments for national teams
2020–21 in European rugby union
2020–21 in Irish rugby union
2020–21 in English rugby union
2020–21 in Welsh rugby union
2020–21 in Scottish rugby union
2020–21 in French rugby union
2020–21 in Italian rugby union
February 2021 sports events in Europe
February 2021 sports events in the United Kingdom
March 2021 sports events in Europe
March 2021 sports events in the United Kingdom